Fanatical is a Canadian half-hour documentary television series produced by Peace Point Entertainment Group and currently airs on TVtropolis and DejaView. FANatical explores the motivations and activities of people involved with the fandom of various television series. The episode dealing with I Dream of Jeannie featured writer/composer/fan Stephen Dolginoff, writer of the musical Thrill Me meeting Barbara Eden.

Episode Information

External links
 Official Site

2006 Canadian television series debuts
2000s Canadian documentary television series